Sunda whistler may refer to:

 Bare-throated whistler, a species of bird endemic to Indonesia.
 Fawn-breasted whistler, a species of bird found in Indonesia and East Timor

Birds by common name